Peggy Carlisle was a British actress.

Selected filmography
 The Man and the Moment (1918)
 Comradeship (1919)
 The Rocks of Valpre (1919)
 God's Good Man (1919)
 Broken Bottles (1920)
 Motherland (1927)
 Hindle Wakes (1927)
 Houp La! (1928)

References

External links
 

Year of birth unknown
Year of death unknown
English film actresses
English silent film actresses
20th-century English actresses
Actresses from Liverpool